Məmişlər or Mamishlar or Mamyshlyar may refer to:
Məmişlər, Sabirabad, Azerbaijan
Məmişlər, Shusha, Azerbaijan
Məmişlər, Dmanisi, Georgia